Carlos Andrés Perlaza Ortíz (born 29 October 1983) was a Colombian footballer.

He played for Cobresal.

References
 
 

1983 births
Living people
Colombian footballers
Colombian expatriate footballers
Atlético Huila footballers
Cobresal footballers
Expatriate footballers in Chile
Association football forwards
Footballers from Cali